Francisco Boza (born 19 September 1964) is a Peruvian sport shooter and Olympic medalist. He won a silver medal in trap shooting at the 1984 Summer Olympics in Los Angeles and came fourth four years later.

Biography
He has competed in eight Olympic Games, from 1980 to 2004, one of only five shooters ever to do so. As of 2010, no other Peruvian had appeared at even six Olympics. Boza qualified for the 2016 Summer Olympics and was the Peruvian flag bearer. He finished in 28th place in the qualifying round of the men's trap shooting competition and did not advance to the semifinals.

See also
List of athletes with the most appearances at Olympic Games
Multi-participation men in shooting at the Olympic Games

References

External links
 

Living people
Peruvian male sport shooters
Trap and double trap shooters
Olympic shooters of Peru
Olympic silver medalists for Peru
Shooters at the 1980 Summer Olympics
Shooters at the 1984 Summer Olympics
Shooters at the 1988 Summer Olympics
Shooters at the 1992 Summer Olympics
Shooters at the 1996 Summer Olympics
Shooters at the 2000 Summer Olympics
Shooters at the 2004 Summer Olympics
Shooters at the 2016 Summer Olympics
1964 births
Olympic medalists in shooting
Medalists at the 1984 Summer Olympics
Pan American Games medalists in shooting
Pan American Games gold medalists for Peru
Shooters at the 2015 Pan American Games
Medalists at the 2015 Pan American Games
20th-century Peruvian people
21st-century Peruvian people